The Victorian Football League's 1897 finals series determined the top four final positions of the 1897 VFL season. It began on the weekend of August 21, 1897, and ended on the weekend of September 3, 1897. Essendon was crowned the 1897 VFL premiers, finishing the finals series on top of the mini-ladder.

Final ladder

Finals system

Abandoned systems
When the VFL was initially established at the end of 1896, it immediately announced that a finals series would be played. However, there were two other announcements of different finals formats, before the system used was ultimately decided upon late in the season.

The format that was originally announced in October 1896 was that after fourteen weeks of home-and-away matches, a finals series would be played as a simple four-team knock out tournament amongst the top four clubs, and the gate takings from the semi-finals would be donated to charity.

By February 1897, the knock-out tournament had been abandoned in favour of a system that bore some similarities to the Page–McIntyre system which would ultimately come into use in 1931. In it, matches were to be played as follows:
Week One: Two matches played: one between 1st vs 2nd, and one between 3rd vs 4th. As originally intended, the takings from these matches would go to charity.
Week Two: Two matches played: one between the winners from Week One and another between the losers from Week One.
Week Three: The two winners from Week Two would play against each other in a Final for the premiership.
Drawn matches would be decided by twenty minutes of extra time, or if still drawn after extra time, by a replay the following week.

It was realized during the season that this finals system was not entirely fair, particularly since the results of the first week of finals were somewhat meaningless; nevertheless, the league was prepared to proceed with the system right up to its scheduled commencement on 14 August. However, when inclement weather on that weekend forced the postponement of the charity round, the league used this opportunity to abandon this finals system and develop a new one.

1897 finals system
On 17 August 1897, a new system was decided upon. The new system comprised a round-robin amongst the top four, with the provision for a play-off match for the premiership depending on the results of that round-robin. The finals system was as follows:
 The top four teams were to play off against each other in a round-robin series played over the following three weekends. 
The match-ups in the first week would be drawn by lot, the match-ups in the second week would be determined by pairing the winners and the losers from the first week against each other, and the remaining pairings would then contest the third week.
 If one club finished as the outright winner of the round-robin series on win–loss record (i.e. without using percentage as a tie-breaker), that club would automatically win the premiership.
 If two clubs had finished with the same win–loss record, those two teams would contest a Final on the following Saturday to decide the premiership.
 If three (or all four) clubs had finished with the same win–loss record, the top two clubs as determined by using percentage as a tie-breaker would contest a Final on the following Saturday to decide the premiership.

As originally planned, the takings for the first week of the finals were donated to charity; the remaining takings were divided amongst the league.

Venue controversy

A point of contention was the venue for the finals matches.

The venues were originally to be drawn by lot, but in early August, the league decided to fix the venues in advance, and in doing so did not schedule a final at Geelong's home ground of Corio Oval, which offered much lower gate takings than the four venues in Melbourne where the matches were originally scheduled (the MCG, the Brunswick Street Oval, the Lake Oval and the East Melbourne Cricket Ground).

This decision was later reversed after Geelong, who had won the minor premiership, lodged an official complaint with the league stating that this arrangement would be unfair to the club and its supporters.

The league agreed with this assessment, and when the finals system was determined on August 17, Geelong was scheduled to host its match in the first week.

Matches

Week one

First round final ( vs. )
 staged a tremendous last quarter fightback to beat  by a goal. Geelong were unable to stop an Essendon comeback in which Tod Collins and Arthur Cleghorn reduced the deficit to a goal, before an error by Geelong player Henry Young let Colin Campbell in for the equalising goal. Essendon player Harry Wright scored a goal soon after and the game was sealed.

First round final ( vs. ) 
Collingwood narrowly defeated Melbourne in probably the finest game of the season. Collingwood's form had vastly improved, although the Melbourne side was sadly depleted through injuries.

Week two

Second round final ( vs ) 
Essendon became the only unbeaten team after round two.

Second round final (Geelong vs Melbourne) 
Geelong finished the stronger to down Melbourne, with a goal by Eddy James near the end winning the game for them. The loss eliminated Melbourne from premiership contention.

Week three

Third round final (Essendon vs Melbourne) 
Entering this game, Essendon could clinch the premiership with a victory, while Melbourne was already eliminated from premiership contention. In the low-scoring encounter, Melbourne hit the post three times and a goal by Essendon player Waugh was disallowed after the bell. Edgar Croft scored the only goal of the match after marking a skewed kick in the forward pocket.
 The match set, and still holds, the record as the lowest-scoring in the history of the VFL/AFL, with only 22 points scored between the two teams; and, Essendon's 1.8 (14) also remains the lowest winning score in league history.

Third round final (Geelong vs Collingwood) 
Geelong's brilliant first-quarter burst meant Collingwood's chances of making it back into the match were near impossible. However, in a thrilling match, Geelong ran out winners by less than a goal.

Finals series ladder

Premiership finals teams 
These are the finals teams for the top two teams in the round-robin series; and, rather than being "Grand Finalists" (because there was no Grand Final match in 1897), they played to decide the premiership. The players that are listed are players used in any one of the three round-robin finals played.

Essendon 

The players listed below are in no particular order, however the captain and vice-captain appear first.

Geelong 

The players listed below are in no particular order, however the captain appears first.

Series records 

 Highest team score: Essendon (2nd rd vs Coll.) – 9.16 (70)
 Lowest team score: Melbourne (3rd rd vs Ess.) – 0.8 (8)
 Highest score in one quarter: Essendon (4th qtr, 2nd rd vs Coll.) – 5.5 (35)
 Lowest score in one quarter: Essendon (3rd qtr, 1st rd vs Geel.) – 0.0 (0)
 Highest winning margin: Essendon (2nd rd vs Coll.) – 40 pts
 Highest aggregate score: Essendon vs Collingwood (2nd rd), Geelong vs Collingwood (3rd rd) – 100 pts
 Most goals kicked by a player in a game: Jack Leith (Melb.) (1st rd vs Coll.), Norman Waugh (Ess.) (2nd rd vs Coll.) – 4 goals
 Most goals kicked by a player for the series: Eddy James (Geel.) (1, 2, 2) – 5 goals
 Highest attendance for one match: Essendon vs Collingwood (MCG, 2nd rd) – 8,000
 Highest gate taking for one match: Collingwood vs Melbourne (MCG, 1st rd) – £174

See also 

 1897 VFL season

References 

1897 in Australian rules football
Australian Football League